Con Amor Se Gana (With Love You Win) is the title of the debut album by American salsa singer Frankie Negrón released on May 20, 1997.

Track listing
This information adapted from Allmusic.

Chart performance

Certification

References

1997 debut albums
Frankie Negrón albums
Warner Music Latina albums